Send a Woman When the Devil Fails is a 1957 French-Italian-West German drama film. It is an adaptation of Jean Amila's novel Sans attendre Godot. Directed by Yves Allégret, it was Alain Delon's and also Bruno Cremer's film debut.

Synopsis 
Angèle (nicknamed "Maine") is the wife of Henri Godot who feels his marriage was menaced by a rival. When Angèle is approached by her former husband Félix he hires a young killer.

Cast 
 Edwige Feuillère as Angèle
 Jean Servais as Henri Godot
 Jean Debucourt as Auguste Coudert de la Taillerie
 Bernard Blier as Félix Seguin
 Bruno Cremer as Bernard
 Alain Delon as Jo
 Henri Cogan as Alberti
 Pascale Roberts as Gigi

References

External links 
 
 

1957 films
French drama films
1950s French-language films
Films directed by Yves Allégret
Italian drama films
West German films
Films based on French novels
German drama films
1950s French films
1950s Italian films
1950s German films